Shri is a former Indian actor who appeared in Tamil language films.

Career
While pursuing a degree in Visual Communications at Alpha and Arts Science College, later at Loyola College, Sri appeared in his first acting role in the television serial Kana Kaanum Kaalangal on STAR Vijay and tried to audition for the lead role in Balaji Sakthivel's Kalloori (2007), without success. Sri was subsequently cast in the director's next film, the drama thriller Vazhakku Enn 18/9 (2012) featuring newcomers, and it went on to open to unanimously positive reviews. To prepare for the role, he went to roadside eateries in Ramapuram and familiarised himself in the lifestyle of settlers. It subsequently went on to win the National Film Award for Best Feature Film in Tamil, as well as Best Film at both the Vijay Awards and the Filmfare Awards, while a reviewer from The Hindu praised Sri's performance, adding "he has large eyes that reveal the right amount of innocence." The success of the film saw him gain further offers, but he was reluctant to only opt for promising scripts and turned down an opportunity to work on Nalan Kumarasamy's Soodhu Kavvum (2013) during the period. His second film, Mysskin's Onaayum Aattukkuttiyum (2013) also fetched critical acclaim, with a critic from Sify.com noting Sri delivers "a riveting performance and is an actor of substance in the making." His following films, the comedy Soan Papdi (2015) and Vil Ambu (2016), which was presented by director Suseenthiran, had low-profile responses at the box office, even though the latter received good reviews.

Sri's next film was Maanagaram (2017) directed by newcomer Lokesh Kanagaraj, and featured him alongside Sundeep Kishan and Regina Cassandra. Portraying a young man frustrated with life in Chennai, Sri won critical acclaim for his role in the film, while the film went on to become one of the most profitable films of the year. Sri then participated in the first season of the Tamil reality show Bigg Boss, but left the show on the fourth day due to personal problems.

Filmography

Television

References

External links

Living people
Tamil male television actors
Television personalities from Tamil Nadu
Male actors from Tamil Nadu
Male actors in Tamil cinema
21st-century Tamil male actors
1983 births
Bigg Boss (Tamil TV series) contestants